Ilteryakovo (İltiräk) is a rural locality (a selo) in Shaymuratovsky Selsoviet, Karmaskalinsky District, Bashkortostan, Russia. The population was 626 as of 2010. There are 12 streets.

Geography 
Ilteryakovo is located 12 km northwest of Karmaskaly (the district's administrative centre) by road. Grachyovka is the nearest rural locality.

References 

Rural localities in Karmaskalinsky District